George Ellis Gomme (January 16, 1912 – March 3, 1996) was a Canadian politician, who represented Lanark in the Legislative Assembly of Ontario from 1958 to 1971 as a Progressive Conservative member.

Background
Gomme was born in London, England in 1912. He was the owner and operator of a local business, Almonte Lumber Store. Gomme was married to Rose Edith Watchorn (died 1991) and had two children, William George (Bill) and Jennifer.

Politics
Gomme served as the Mayor of Almonte, Ontario.

Gomme was elected in a by-election to replace John Arthur McCue who died after having served for only one year. He was re-elected in the general election of 1959 and 1963. He was appointed as a Minister without Portfolio on January 12, 1966, and then as Minister of Highways on November 24, 1966. A time of tremendous growth in Ontario, particularly in Toronto and surrounding suburbs, Gomme was actively involved in the development of new highways, such as Highway 410 in the Brampton area, as well as the expansion of other 400-series highways. He continued to serve as Minister of Highways until March 1, 1971. at which time he left Cabinet, having already announced that he would not be running in the 1971 general election. He died on March 3, 1996.

Cabinet posts

References

External links 
 

1912 births
1996 deaths
Mayors of places in Ontario
Progressive Conservative Party of Ontario MPPs
People from Almonte, Ontario
British emigrants to Canada